The Sharya Forest Museum Railway is a -gauge forest railway based at open-air Sharya Forest Museum located in Sharya, opened in 2014.

Current status 
The Sharya Forest Museum Railway is a  narrow gauge railroad loop passing through the Sharya Park in Kostroma Oblast. The museum railway was opened in 2014. The exhibit consists mostly of locomotives, passenger and freight cars, tractors, skidders, forestry vehicles and machines.

Museum's collection
The museum owns many interesting vehicles, which are important for the Russian railway and forestry history including:

Locomotives and draisines
 TU8 – No. 0167
 Draisine – TD-5u

Railway cars 
 Passenger car – PV-40T

Aeronautical engineering 
 Plane aircraft protection — An-2 (RA-29327)

See also 
 Sharya
 Narrow gauge railways in Russia
 List of Russian narrow gauge railways rolling stock

References

External links 

 Photo – project "Steam Engine" 

Railway museums in Russia
750 mm gauge railways in Russia
Rail transport in Kostroma Oblast
Logging railways in Russia